Delight was a Polish gothic metal band.

Musicians

Discography
Studio albums 
 Last Temptation (2000)
 The Fading Tale (2001)
 Eternity (2002)
 Anew (2004)
 Od Nowa (2004)
 Breaking Ground (2007)

Video albums 

 Music videos

References

External links
 Official website 

Polish heavy metal musical groups
Polish gothic metal musical groups
Musical groups established in 1997
Metal Mind Productions artists